is a Japanese four-panel manga series by Riko Korie. It has been serialized since September 2013 in Media Factory's seinen manga magazine Comic Cune, which was originally a magazine supplement in the seinen manga magazine Monthly Comic Alive until August 2015. It has been collected in three tankōbon volumes.  An anime television series adaptation by EMT Squared premiered on April 4, 2018.

Characters

Media

Manga
Alice or Alice is a four-panel manga series by Riko Korie, a Japanese artist who mainly illustrates light novels and visual novels. The series was initially published in Comic Cune as a one-shot in 2013. It began serialization in Comic Cune'''s November 2013 issue released on September 27, 2013; At first, Comic Cune was a "magazine in magazine" placed in Monthly Comic Alive, later it became independent of Comic Alive and changed to a formal magazine on August 27, 2015. Three tankōbon'' volumes of the manga were released between January 23, 2015 and March 23, 2018.

Anime
The 12-episode anime television series adaptation by EMT Squared from  April 4 to June 20, 2018. The series is directed by Kōsuke Kobayashi and written by Saeka Fujimoto, with character designs by Naoko Kuwabara. The opening theme titled "A or A!?" is performed by petit milady and the ending theme titled "LONELY ALICE" is performed by Pyxis. Sentai Filmworks has licensed the series and is streaming it on Hidive in North America, Australia, New Zealand, the United Kingdom, South America, Spain and Portugal.

Notes

References

External links
 

Anime series based on manga
EMT Squared
Media Factory manga
Kadokawa Dwango franchises
Seinen manga
Sentai Filmworks
Yonkoma